Indiana Beach is an amusement park located on Lake Shafer in Monticello, Indiana. The resort was developed by the Spackman family, who owned it from 1926 to 2008. The park was then sold to Morgan RV LLC, Apex Parks Group, LLC, and now is owned and operated by IB Parks & Entertainment.

History 
Originally named Ideal Beach, the amusement park began as a small lakeside beach with a bath house and refreshment stand opened by Earl W. Spackman. In 1927, the first thrill attraction opened, and from that point, it began to expand. In the 1930s and 1940s, it was popular for the Ideal Beach Ballroom, featuring well-known bands. In 1961, Indiana Beach added a paddle wheeler boat called the Shafer Queen, which operated for 11 years before being replaced by another paddle wheeler with the same name. 

In February 2008, both the amusement park and Indiana Beach campgrounds were sold to Morgan RV LLC. On September 1, 2015, the park was sold to Apex Parks Group.

On February 18, 2020, Indiana Beach suddenly announced that it would permanently close after 94 years of operation, with no plans to reopen. Apex Parks Group cited financial difficulties for the closure and said they had "worked diligently" to find a new buyer for the park but had not been successful. In addition to dozens of seasonal workers, Indiana Beach employed 27 people in administrative and maintenance positions. Those workers were offered six weeks compensation.

In March 2020, Apex Parks Group said that it was in discussions with potential buyers of the park, and that it was possible that the park would be able to reopen that year. Because Indiana Beach generates a large part of the county's tourism revenue, White County officials agreed to offer $3 million from the White County Windfarm Economic Development Fund to the buyer after the sale was complete.

In April 2020, Indiana Beach announced that the park would be reopening that year. The park has been purchased by Chicago businessman Gene Staples, subject to approval of a $3 million loan from White County. The park reopened on June 27, 2020.

Rides

Roller coasters

Water park attractions and rides

Major rides

Attractions
 Cap'n Crow's Bumper Boats
 Dr. Frankenstein's Haunted Castle – A walk-through attraction
 SkyCoaster

Kiddieland
 Beach Buggies
 Boogie Boats
 Crazy Carp
 First Flight
 Leap Frog
 Mini Motors
 Rocky's Roundup
 Wild Wagons

Former rides
 Bullet
 Chaos
 Grand Carousel
 Dragon Wagon (roller coaster) (2014-2018)
 Galaxi (roller coaster) (1971-2013)
 Growler - Spinning Family Ride
 Mystery Mansion
 Pumpkin Ferris Wheel
 Skydiver
 Splash Battle
 Superstition Mountain Mine Ride
 Trabant
 Twister
 Viper
 Zugspitz

Former attractions
 Adventure Point
 Boat Tag

Games
 Fascination
 Gallery of Ghouls – Shooting gallery
 Skee Ball
 Video Arcade
 21
 Quackerz

Lodging and cabins
Lodging at Indiana Beach includes hotel, motel and cabin accommodations with varying prices, sleeping capacities and amenities. There are also campground facilities named Indiana Beach/Monticello KOA containing approximately 1,000 camp sites.

Controversies
In 2011, former and current employees staged a protest due to working and safety conditions at the park, claiming that "Rides are continuously closed, or many times forced to be open using rigged components because the company will not or cannot pay for the parts that will allow maintenance to fix them properly." An inspector from the state's division of Homeland Security investigated as a result of the protest and found no major safety violations.

It was reported in December 2012 that Morgan RV LLC had sold 11 of its properties to Sun Communities Operating Limited Partnership LLC of Michigan for $135 million. Among the listed properties was Ideal Private Resorts LLC, whose website includes Indiana Beach Amusement Park and Indiana Beach Accommodations as destinations. Calls by news media to Morgan RV LLC requesting comment, including confirmation or denial that all or part of Indiana Beach was included in the sale, went unanswered.

In January 2013, local news affiliates reported Morgan RV LLC was delinquent paying property and innkeeper taxes totaling approximately $347,000 to White County, where Indiana Beach is located. The CEO of then-owner Morgan RV, Robert Moser, and Indiana Beach's general manager, Bob Gallagher, stated that the park would open for the 2014 season despite misgivings stated by Monticello residents and business owners.

On June 27, 2019, a twelve-year-old boy died after suffering a medical emergency on a roller coaster at the park; it was determined it was not caused by Indiana Beach or the ride.

References

External links

Indiana Beach Amusement Resort
IB Parks & Entertainment
Photos of Indiana Beach

Amusement parks in Indiana
1926 establishments in Indiana
Tourist attractions in White County, Indiana
Buildings and structures in White County, Indiana
IB Parks & Entertainment
Companies that filed for Chapter 11 bankruptcy in 2020